Eve Gil (born 1968) is a Mexican writer and journalist from Hermosillo, Sonora. She is one of the major "NAFTA generation" authors. Her work has won a number of awards such as Premio La Gran Novela Sonorense in 1993, the Premio Nacional de Periodismo Fernando Benítez in 1994, the Concurso de Libro Sonorense in 1994, 1996 and 2006, and the Premio Nacional de Cuento Efraín Huerta in 2006.

Novels

Hombres necios, Instituto Sonorense de Cultura, 1996.
El suplicio de Adán, Instituto Sonorense de Cultura, 1998.
Réquiem por una muñeca rota (Cuento para asustar al lobo), Fondo Editorial Tierra Adentro, 2000.
Cenotafio de Beatriz, RD Editores, Seville, Spain, 2005.
Sho-shan y la Dama Oscura, Santillana Ediciones Generales, 2009.
Tinta Violeta Santillana Ediciones Generales, 2011
Réquiem para una muñeca rota, Santillana Ediciones Generales, 2013
Doncella Roja Santillana Ediciones Generales, 2013

Short fiction

Sueños de Lot, Editorial Porrúa, 2007
La reina baila hasta morir, Ediciones Fósforo, 2009.
El perrito de Lady Chatterlay (Collection of the short stories published previously in "Sueños de Lot" and "La reina baila hasta morir"), 2010.

Poetry

Raíz y canto, Instituto Sonorense de Cultura, 1995.

Selected anthologies

Jóvenes Creadores del FONCA 1995-96, Conaculta, 1996
Novísimos cuentos de la república mexicana, Ed. Mayra Inzunza, Fondo Editorial Tierra Adentro, 2004.
Con un vuelco en el corazón, Editorial Garabatos, 2006

Requiem for a Broken Doll

Requiem for a Broken Doll tells the story of Moramay, a thirteen-year-old girl growing up in the early 80's in Mexico City. An English translation is underway. Excerpts from the novel have appeared in BorderSenses, Fairy Tale Review, and Words without Borders. http://wordswithoutborders.org/article/damned-spring/

References

External links
Eve Gil's blog
Moramay's website
Damned Spring

1968 births
Living people
Mexican women novelists
Mexican bloggers
People from Hermosillo
Mexican women bloggers
Writers from Sonora